Höchenschwand is a municipality in the district of Waldshut in Baden-Württemberg in Germany.

See also
 List of cities and towns in Germany

References

External links
 Höchenschwand 

Waldshut (district)
Baden
Hotzenwald